Bryce Evan Hamilton (born November 10, 2000) is an American professional basketball player for the South Bay Lakers of the NBA G League. He played college basketball  for the UNLV Runnin' Rebels of the Mountain West Conference (MWC).

Early life and high school career
Hamilton grew up playing football for the Pasadena Trojans Pop Warner program but stopped in eighth grade when he thought it was getting too physical and he had a growth spurt. He played basketball for Pasadena High School in Pasadena, California. As a junior, Hamilton averaged 24.6 points and 8.2 rebounds per game and was named Pasadena Star-News All-Area Player of the Year. In his senior season, he averaged 24.4 points and 7.2 rebounds per game, repeating as Pasadena Star-News All-Area Player of the Year. He was a McDonald's All American nominee. Hamilton was a four-star recruit and committed to play college basketball for UNLV over offers from Nevada, Ohio State, Utah, Arizona State and Colorado.

College career

As a freshman at UNLV, Hamilton averaged 4.3 points per game, shooting 35.3 percent from the field. After the season, coach Marvin Menzies was fired and Hamilton entered the NCAA transfer portal. He opted to return to UNLV following a conversation with new coach T. J. Otzelberger. Hamilton had breakout success during conference play in his sophomore season. On January 18, 2020, he scored a season-high 35 points in a 99–78 win over New Mexico. On January 26, Hamilton recorded 29 points and 10 rebounds in a 71–67 loss to fourth-ranked San Diego State. He was named to the First Team All-Mountain West after averaging 16 points and 5.5 rebounds per game as a sophomore. As a junior, Hamilton averaged 17.9 points and 6 rebounds per game, earning Second Team All-Mountain West honors. Following the season, he entered the transfer portal, but ultimately returned to UNLV. On January 28, 2022, Hamilton scored a career-high 45 points in an 88–74 win over Colorado State. He was named to the First Team All-Mountain West as a senior.  On March 28, 2022, Hamilton declared for the 2022 NBA draft, forgoing his remaining college eligibility.

Professional career

South Bay Lakers (2022–present)
On October 10, 2022, Hamilton signed with the Los Angeles Lakers after going undrafted in the 2022 NBA draft. He was waived the next day. On November 3, 2022, Hamilton was named to the opening night roster.

Career statistics

College

|-
| style="text-align:left;"| 2018–19
| style="text-align:left;"| UNLV
| 31 || 0 || 13.0 || .353 || .296 || .630 || 1.6 || .6 || .3 || .2 || 4.3
|-
| style="text-align:left;"| 2019–20
| style="text-align:left;"| UNLV
| 32 || 14 || 27.2 || .453 || .339 || .679 || 5.5 || 1.4 || .7 || .2 || 16.0
|-
| style="text-align:left;"| 2020–21
| style="text-align:left;"| UNLV
| 24 || 24 || 32.6 || .430 || .313 || .656 || 6.0 || 3.0 || 1.3 || .1 || 17.9
|-
| style="text-align:left;"| 2021–22
| style="text-align:left;"| UNLV
| 32 || 31 || 32.3 || .430 || .346 || .768 || 5.0 || 2.2 || .8 || .1 || 21.8
|- class="sortbottom"
| style="text-align:center;" colspan="2"| Career
|| 119 || 69 || 26.0 || .429 || .331 || .710 || 4.4 || 1.7 || .8 || .1 || 14.9

Personal life
Hamilton's older brother, Blake, played college basketball for Buffalo before embarking on a professional career. Three of his cousins, Daniel, Isaac and Jordan, play professionally; Daniel and Jordan were drafted into the NBA.

References

External links
UNLV Runnin' Rebels bio

2000 births
Living people
American men's basketball players
Basketball players from Pasadena, California
Pasadena High School (California) alumni
Shooting guards
UNLV Runnin' Rebels basketball players